Kalyanpur  is a former village development committee, and now headquarters of Khadak Municipality in Saptari District in the Sagarmatha Zone of south-eastern Nepal. At the time of the 2011 Nepal census it had a population of 8,724 people living in 1,705 individual households. This is one of the well-developed village development committee in Saptari District.
Kalyanpur is a village development committee in Saptari District in the Sagarmatha Zone of south-eastern Nepal. At the time of the 2011 Nepal census it had a population of 8724 people living in 1705 individual households. This is one of the well-developed village development committee in Saptari District.
VDC Name	 :Kalyanpur
VDC Households	 :1705
District Name	 :Saptari
Area in Square Km	 :19.1
Zone	 :Sagarmatha
Development Region :Eastern
Ecological Zone	 :Terai
Ecological Sub Zone	 :Eastern Terai
Male	 :4144
Female	 :4580
Total Population	 :8724
Population Density	 :457 per km2

References

Populated places in Saptari District
VDCs in Saptari District